Mothobi Mvala (born 14 June 1994) is a South African soccer player who plays as a midfielder for Mamelodi Sundowns. He has also represented South Africa internationally.

References

External links
 
 
 

South African soccer players
1994 births
Living people
Footballers at the 2016 Summer Olympics
Olympic soccer players of South Africa
Association football midfielders
South African Premier Division players
National First Division players
South Africa international soccer players
Highlands Park F.C. players
People from Masilonyana Local Municipality